Appleton Township is an inactive township in St. Clair County, in the U.S. state of Missouri.

Appleton Township was erected in 1880, taking its name from the community of Appleton City, Missouri.

References

Townships in Missouri
Townships in St. Clair County, Missouri